Stadnicka Wola  is a village in the administrative district of Gmina Końskie, within Końskie County, Świętokrzyskie Voivodeship, in south-central Poland.

During the German occupation of Poland (World War II), the Germans carried out a massacre of 27 Poles in the forest of Stadnicka Wola on April 8, 1940 (see also Nazi crimes against the Polish nation).

Notable people
 Jadwiga Janus (1931–2019), Polish sculptor

References

Stadnicka Wola